Bilasse is a village in the rural commune of Boutoupa-Camaracounda, in the Niaguis Arrondissement, in the Ziguinchor Department of the Ziguinchor Region.
In 2002 it had a population of 186 people.

References

External links
PEPAM

Populated places in the Ziguinchor Department